Wild is a surname. Notable people with the surname include:

Allan Wild (1927–2019), New Zealand architect and academic
Anke Wild (born 1967), German field hockey player 
 (1908–1946), British Army officer
Dölf Wild (born 1954), Swiss historian and archaeologist
Earl Wild (1915–2010), American pianist
Ed Wild (1935–2020), Canadian basketball player
Edward A. Wild (1825–1891), American homeopathic doctor and US Civil War General
Sir Ernest Wild (1869–1934), British Judge and Conservative Member of Parliament
Frank Wild (1873–1939), British Antarctic explorer
Franz Wild (1791–1860), Austrian opera singer
Gerald Wild (1907–1996), Australian MP and government minister
Hans-Peter Wild (born 1941), chairman of the WILD GmbH & Co.KG
Harry J. Wild (1901–1961) American cinematographer
Heinrich Wild (1877–1951), Swiss designer of geodetic instruments
Heinrich von Wild (1833–1902), Swiss physicist and meteorologist
Jack Wild (1952–2006), British actor
Jessica Wild (born 1980), Puerto Rican drag queen
John Daniel Wild (1902–1972), American philosopher
John Paul Wild (1923–2008), British-born Australian scientist
Jonathan Wild (c.1683 – 1725), eighteenth-century English crime boss
Kirsten Wild (born 1982), Dutch road and track cyclist
Paul Wild (rugby league), rugby league footballer of the 1980s
Paul Wild (1925–2014), Swiss astronomer
Peter Wild (1940–2009), University of Arizona English professor and poet
Peter J. Wild (born 1939), Swiss electronics engineer
Rudolf Wild (1904–1995), founder of the WILD GmbH & Co.KG
Stephen Wild (born 1981), British rugby league footballer
Susan Wild (born 1957), American politician 
Vic Wild (born 1986), American-Russian snowboarder
Wolfgang Wild (curator) (born 1970), English curator and writer
Wolfgang Wild (physicist) (born 1930), German nuclear physicist, academic administrator and politician

See also
House of Wild, a Saxon noble family
Lacey Wildd (born 1968), American model and actress
Wilde, list of people with the surname Wilde
Wylde (surname), list of people with the surname Wylde

References

German-language surnames
English-language surnames